Stefan Kozalla (born 1972), better known as DJ Koze, is a German DJ and music producer.

Biography
Born in Flensburg, Schleswig-Holstein, Kozalla first became known in the Hamburg music scene. In the early 1990s, he started as a rapper and DJ for various hip-hop groups in Flensburg. In 1991, DJ Koze reached second place in the German DMC Championship (an offshoot of the Disco Mix Club). Two years later, he moved to Hamburg and founded together with Cosmic DJ, DJ Stachy and the "Schreckliche Sven" the hip hop formation Fischmob, which persisted for about five years.

In parallel, he also dealt with electronic music, increased his name recognition as a DJ and produced some remixes, sometimes under the pseudonym Adolf Noise. A collection of such remixes appeared in 2000 under the title Music Is Okay. With Max Goldt as spokesman he released 2001 as Adolf Noise the single "Deine Reime sind Schweinereime", a satire on battle rap tracks in German hip hop.

Together with Cosmic DJ and Erobique he founded the project International Pony, from 2002 the album We Love Music and 2006 the LP Mit Dir sind wir vier. Since 2003, Koze published several Techno-Maxis at the Cologne label Kompakt under the name Monaco Schranze (a corruption of Monaco Franze and Schranz). There also appeared in 2004 his second mix CD titled All People Is My Friends.

As a DJ, he also performed at major festivals such as Coachella, Osheaga, Outside Lands, Roskilde, Sónar, Tomorrowland, SonneMondSterne, Melt!, Time Warp, Mayday, Mutek, Amsterdam Dance Event, Snowbombing, Nature One, and Meredith Music Festival. In reader surveys of the music magazines Spex, Intro and de: Bug he was repeatedly voted DJ of the Year.

The productions under the name Adolf Noise are generally more experimental and eccentric. After Wunden, s. Beine offen appeared in April 2005, the second Adolf Noise album Wo die Rammelwolle fliegt.

Since 2009 he runs the label Pampa Records. With his on Pampa Records released album 2013 Amygdala he entered for the first time the official German and Swiss charts. In addition, he was honored for the Echo Award 2014 with the Critics Award. On June 15, 2015, the 50th edition of the DJ Mix series DJ Kicks, was released on the Berlin label Studio !K7, which attracted a great deal of national and international attention. In 2017, he was nominated for two Electronic Music Awards for Record of the Year and Remix of the Year, both for his Extended Disco Version of Låpsley's "Operator".

In January 2018, DJ Koze announced his fourth studio album titled Knock Knock, which appeared on May 4, 2018 on his label Pampa Records. On July 12, 2018, his remix of the track Humility was released with the single The Now Now of the British band Gorillaz.

On October 19, 2018, he was awarded the Prize for Pop Culture in the category "Favorite Producer" at the Tempodrom Berlin.

DJ Koze performed at Sydney Opera House Concert Hall for the first time on 12 December 2019 and also debuted his new A/V show, Popup Jungle. 

Róisín Murphy has announced in March 2023 her signing to Ninja Tune with a new single, 'CooCool', which was produced by DJ Koze.

Internationally, his name is pronounced like cozy in (American) English.

Awards 
Echo Pop

 2014: Critics' choice award (Amygdala)

DJ Awards

 2018: Category „Electronica/Downtempo“ (DJ Koze)

Preis für Popkultur

 2018: Category „favourite producer“ (Knock Knock)

Pitchfork - The 50 Best Albums of 2018

 2018: 3rd Place - Knock Knock

Pitchfork - The 100 Best Songs of 2018

 2018: 5th Place - Pick Up

MIXMAG - The Top 50 Tracks of 2018

 2018: 1st Place - Pick Up

Noisey - The 100 Best Albums of 2018

 2018: 9th Place - Knock Knock

Resident Advisor - 2018's Best Tracks

 2018: Pick Up

Rolling Stone - 50 Best Albums of 2018 So Far

 2018: Knock Knock

FM4 - Most Wanted - 100 besten Clubtracks des Jahres

 2018: 1st Place - Pick Up

Discography

Studio albums

Studio albums
 2005: Kosi Comes Around
 2013: Amygdala
 2018: Knock Knock

Extended plays

 1998: Happy Hip Hop (Yo Mama)
 2001: Deine Reime Sind Schweine (Regelrechte Schweine) (Buback)
 2003: The Geklöppel Continues (Kompakt Records)
 2004: Late Check Out (Kompakt Records)
 2004: Speicher 20 (Kompakt Extra)
 2005: Lighta Spuba (Freude am Tanzen)
 2006: Kosi Comes Around – Remixes Part 1 (Kompakt Records)
 2006: Stompin at the Clubfoot (Kompakt Records)
 2007: All The Time (Philpot)
 2007: Naked (Cereal/Killers)
 2008: I Want To Sleep (International Records Recordings)
 2009: Mrs. Bojangels (Circus Company)
 2010: Rue Burnout / Blume der Nacht (Pampa Records)
 2012: My Orphaned Son / It's Only (Pampa Records)
 2014: La Duquesa / Burn With Me (Pampa Records)
 2013: Amygdala Remixes #1 (Pampa Records)
 2014: Amygdala Remixes #2 (Pampa Records)
 2014: La Duquesa / Burn With Me (Pampa Records)
 2015: XTC (Pampa Records)
 2016: Driven (Hart&Tief)
 2018: Seeing Aliens (Pampa Records)
 2018: Pick Up (Pampa Records)
 2021: Record Store Day 2021 Exclusive (Pampa Records)
 2022: knock knock Remixes #1 (Pampa Records)
 2022: knock knock Remixes #2 (Pampa Records)
 2023: Róisín Murphy & DJ Koze – Can't Replicate 12” Edit (White Label)

Compilations
 2000: Music Is Okay (Yo Mama)
 2009: Reincarnations: The Remix Chapter 2001-2009 (Get Physical Music)
 2014: Reincarnations Pt. II: The Remix Chapter 2009-2014 (Pampa Records)

DJ mixsets
 2004: All People Is My Friends
 2009: Resident Advisor #145
 2013: FACT 387
 2013: XLR8R 324
 2015: DJ-Kicks: DJ Koze (#50)

Remixes

 Herbert – It’s Only (DJ Koze Remix)
 Moderat – Bad Kingdom (DJ Koze Remix)
 Mount Kimbie – Made to Stray (DJ Koze Remix)
Malaria! vs. Chicks On Speed – Kaltes Klares Wasser (DJ Koze Remix)
Blumfeld – Tausend Tränen Tief (Loverboy Mix)
Fettes Brot – Silberfische In Meinem Bett (Adolf Noise Meets Fettes Blut)
Die Goldenen Zitronen – Weil Wir Einverstanden Sind (DJ Koze a.k.a. Adolf Noise Remix)
Egoexpress – Telefunken (DJ Koze Remix)
Rocko Schamoni – The Diskoteer (DJ Koze Remix)
Die Fantastischen Vier – Le Smou (DJ Koze & Mario Von Hacht Rmx)
Reinhard Voigt – Zu Dicht Dran (DJ Koze Remix)
Hildegard Knef – Ich Liebe Euch (DJ Koze Remix)
Andreas Dorau – Kein Liebeslied (DJ Koze Remix)
Ada – Eve (DJ Koze Remix)
Ada – Faith (DJ Koze Remix)
Heiko Voss – I Think About You (DJ Koze Mix)
 Mano Le Tough – Energy Flow (DJ Koze Remixes)
James Figurine – Apologies (DJ Koze Rmx)
 Wassermann – Die Schallplatte (DJ Koze Remix)
Meloboy – Hot Love (DJ Koze Mix)
Wechsel Garland – Mutes (DJ Koze's Broken CD-Mix)
Blagger – Strange Behavior (DJ Koze AKA Swhaimi Remix)
Alter Ego – Jolly Joker (DJ Koze's Nuttich Styler Remix)
Battles – Atlas (DJ Koze Remix)
Gerd – 1 In The Morning (At The Club) (DJ Koze Remix)
Sascha Funke – Mango Cookie (DJ Koze Remix)
Mathias Kaden – Kawaba (DJ Koze's Kosi-San Remix)
Nôze – Danse Avec Moi (DJ Koze Rework)
Matthew Dear – Elementary Lover (Dj Koze Rmx)
Lawrence – Rabbit Tube (DJ Koze Remix)
 Låpsley – Operator (DJ Koze Remix) (XL)
Caribou – Found Out (DJ Koze Remix)
Caribou – Jamelia (DJ Koze Remix)
The Big Crunch Theory – Distortion (DJ Koze Remix)
Who Made Who – Keep Me In My Plane (DJ Koze Hudson River Dub)
Makossa & Megablast Feat. Cleydys Villalon – Soy Como Soy (DJ Koze No Voy A Cambiar Repaso)
Efdemin – There Will Be Singing (DJ Koze Remix)
 Michael Mayer & Joe Goddard – For You (DJ Koze Remixes)
Chilly Gonzales – Knight Moves (DJ Koze Remix)
Apparat – Black Water (DJ Koze Remix)
Superflu – Jo Gurt (Dj Koze RMX)
 2raumwohnung – Somebody Lonely and Me (Remixes)
 Matias Aguayo – Minimal (DJ Koze Remix)
Underworld – I Exhale (DJ Koze Remix)
Roman Flügel – 9 Years (DJ Koze Remix)
Radio Slave – Reverse (DJ Koze Edit)
 Gorillaz – Humility (DJ Koze Remix)
 Radio Slave – Reverse (DJ Koze Edit)
 Gerry Read – It’ll All Be Over (DJ Koze remix)
Sebjak & Fahlberg - 4Ever She May Live (DJ Koze Edit)
Lakou Mizik & Joseph Ray - Sanba Yo Pran Pale (DJ Koze Remix)
José González - Tjomme (Dj Koze Remix)
Solomun feat. Jamie Foxx - Ocean (DJ Koze Remix)
Peggy Gou - I Go (DJ Koze Remix)
Melle Brown feat. Annie Mac - Feel About You (DJ Koze Remix)
Dumbo Tracks - Everybody Knows (DJ Koze Remix) feat. Markus Acher
Róisín Murphy & DJ Koze – Can't Replicate 12” Edit (White Label)

With Adolf Noise
 1996: Wunden, S. Beine Offen
2001: Deine Reime Sind Schweine (Regelrechte Schweine)
 2005: Wo die Rammelwolle fliegt

With Fischmob
 1995: Männer können seine Gefühle nicht zeigen
 1998: Power

With Monaco Schranze
 2003: Speicher 11 (with Naum)
 2004: Speicher 25 (with Gebr. Teichmann)
With Marteria

 2021: Paradise Delay, Neonwest, Loft &Liebe (feat. Miss Platnum & Hacki), Zug der Erkenntnis

References

External links
 Official website Pampa Records
 
DJ Koze on Discogs
DJ Koze on Allmusic
DJ Koze on Instagram
Pampa Records on YouTube

1972 births
Living people
People from Flensburg
German electronic musicians
Musicians from Hamburg